The Chunwon (Korean: 천원전, Hanja: 天元戰) was a Go competition in Korea. Begun in 1996, it was held nineteen times and was discontinued after 2015.

The winner of the Chunwon went on to play the winner of the Chinese equivalent (the Tianyuan), in the annual China–Korea Tengen competition.

Outline
The Chunwon Cup was the equivalent to the Tengen in Japan. This tournament replaced the Baccus Cup. The sponsors were Far East Pharmaceuticals and Daily Economic Newspaper. The komi was 6.5 points. The time limits were 5 hours in the final, 4 in the main knockout, and 3 in the preliminaries. The winner's purse was 20,000,000 ($17,000).

Past winners and runners-up

See also 
 Tianyuan (Go)
 Tengen (Go)

References

External links
 Sensei's Library
 gotoeveryone.k2ss.info
 Korea Baduk Association (in Korean)

Go competitions in South Korea